The 2011–12 Women's National Cricket League season was the 16th season of the Women's National Cricket League, the women's domestic limited overs cricket competition in Australia. The tournament started on 22 October 2011 and finished on 14 January 2012. Defending champions New South Wales Breakers won the tournament for the 14th time after topping the ladder at the conclusion of the group stage and beating Victorian Spirit in the final.

Ladder

Fixtures

Round-robin phase

Final

Statistics

Highest totals

Most runs

Most wickets

References

External links
 Series home at ESPNcricinfo

 
Women's National Cricket League seasons
 
Women's National Cricket League